Edson Rivas (born 23 October 2001) is a Venezuelan professional footballer who plays for Deportivo La Guaira as a midfielder.

References

External links

2001 births
Living people
Venezuelan footballers
Association football midfielders